The Cha-Kjeri Formation is an Eifelian geologic formation of central Bolivia. The formation comprises red sandstones deposited in a marine environment.

Fossil content 
The formation has provided fossils of Globithyris aff. diana.

See also 
 List of fossiliferous stratigraphic units in Bolivia

References

Further reading 
  P. E. Isaacson. 1977. Devonian stratigraphy and brachiopod paleontology of Bolivia. part A: Orthida and Strophomenida. Palaeontographica Abteilung A 155(5-6):133-192

Geologic formations of Bolivia
Devonian System of South America
Devonian Bolivia
Eifelian Stage
Sandstone formations
Devonian south paleopolar deposits
Formations